Beer, Wine and Spirits (BWS) is an Australian retail chain of liquor stores owned by Endeavour Group.

History
BWS began operations in June 2001 as a local neighbourhood bottleshop. BWS was a brand of the Woolworths Liquor Group which also included Dan Murphy's, Cellarmasters and Pinnacle Liquor. The freestanding liquor division of Woolworths was distinguished from the Woolworths Supermarket Liquor and Safeway Liquor stores, in that it stood alone from Supermarkets. The first BWS was opened in Cabramatta, Sydney, the site of a Woolworths owned Mac's Liquor Store. The Safeway brand including Safeway Liquor was later also rebranded Woolworths and Woolworths Liquor respectively.

In 2012, Woolworths Liquor and BWS shared all promotions, prices and specials between the two brands. All 475 Woolworths Supermarket Liquor stores were rebranded to BWS by 2013, resulting in a network of 1,180 BWS stores after the rebranding. These stores now operate as free standing BWS stores, financially and managerially separate from the adjacent Woolworths supermarkets. A handful are known to be adjacent to Coles Supermarkets, such as in Mount Warren Park, Queensland.

As of June 2014, BWS has over 1,200 stores Australia wide, a majority including the ALH Group sites. They recently have been buying and converting independent liquor stores such as Darlinghurst Cellars along Oxford Street near Hyde Park, Sydney. BWS owns several beer brands including John Boston, Tun, Arc Valley and Sail & Anchor through Pinnacle Drinks.

As of 2017, BWS has over 1,300 stores Australia wide. As of April 2019, BWS has 1,355 stores Australian wide.

In 2019, Woolworths restructured its alcoholic drinks business to form Endeavour Group, including BWS. Endeavour Group demerged from Woolworths Group in June 2021.

References

External links

Alcohol distribution retailers in Australia
Companies based in Sydney
Retail companies established in 2001
Woolworths Group (Australia)
2001 establishments in Australia
Wine retailers